Italy competed at the 2013 World Games held in Cali, Colombia, from 25 July to 4 August.

Medals
Updated after the sixth day of competition (1 August 2013).

See also
2013 World Games
Italy at the World Games

References

External links
 Oltre Cinquecerchi at CONI web site
2013 World Games Official website

2013
Nations at the 2013 World Games
2013 in Italian sport